Collections of Greek inscriptions initially started from the 3rd century BC and continued with collections of epigrams and short poems, which after the 1st century AD were called Anthologies. These anthologies of Greek epigrams were enlarged with additions of earlier collections, culminating in what is called today "Greek Anthology".

These include:

Attic inscriptions by Philochorus, 3rd century BC
Soros, 3rd century BC, collection in which there were epigrams of Posidippus of Pella
Epigrammata, 3rd century BC, collection of epigrams, attributed to Posidippus, of the same time as of Soros, but written later
On the inscriptions to be found in cities, of Polemon of Athens, 2nd century BC
About the offering in Delphi, of Alcetas the traveller
, of Menetor
Theban Epigrams of Aristodemus of Thebes
Peri epigrammaton ("About epigrams") of Neoptolemus of Paros
Garland of Meleagros (Στέφανος τοῦ Μελεάγρου), of Meleager of Gadara, about 1st century AD.
Garland of Philippus (Στέφανος τοῦ Φιλίππου τοῦ Θεσσαλονικέως), by Philippus of Thessalonica, mid-1st century AD.
Sylloge Rufiniana, supposed collection of epigrams of Rufinus found in Book V of the Palatine Anthology (or together with epigrams from other poets)
Anthologion of epigrams about rivers, lakes, cliffs, mountains and mountaintops, Diogenianus
Musa Puerilis, anthology of Straton of Sardis, 2nd century, with pederastic content
Pammetros of Diogenes Laërtius, 3rd century
The Sylloge of Palladas, 6th century collection of epigrams and epic fragments
Cycle of New Epigrams, also known as "Cycle of Agathias" by Agathias, 6th century
Anacreontea, a collection originally attributed pseudepigraphically to Anacreon preserved in Anthologia Palatina (poems ranging from the 1st century BC to the 6th century AD)
Sylloge Parisina
Sylloge Euphemiana (about 890)
Syllogae minores, a series of smaller collections from various sources, among which are Sylloge Parisina and Sylloge Euphemiana already mentioned above
Anthology of Cephalas – compiled by Constantine Cephalas in the last decades of the ninth century; most important sources include the Garlands of Meleager and Philip, the Anthology of Diogenian, the Sylloge of Pallada and the Cycle of Agathias
Palatine Anthology (Anthologia Palatina) – Byzantine anthology completed after 944, mostly a copy of Cephalas' anthology alongside other collections of epigrams and some longer poems.
Anthology of Planudes (Anthologia Graeca Planudea) Maximus Planudes, 1299 (based mainly on apographon or on apographa of the Anthology of Cephalas)
Greek Anthology (Anthologia Graeca): Term currently used for the collection of epigrams and poems of the Palatine and the Planudean Anthologies, as well as from other sources

References

Poetry anthologies
Ancient Greek literature
Greek literature (post-classical)
Byzantine literature
Greek Anthology